People's Palace may refer to:

People's Palace, Adelaide, a former Salvation Army hostel in Australia
People's Palace, Brisbane, a former temperance hotel in Australia
People's Palace, Djibouti City, a monument in Djibouti City, Djibouti
People's Palace, Glasgow, a museum and glasshouse in Glasgow, Scotland
People's Palace, Mile End, built in 1886 in the East End of London, and now part of Queen Mary University of London
People's Palace, the Presidential Palace in Damascus, Syria
Alexandra Palace, London, also called "The People's Palace"
Palace of the Parliament, Bucharest, formerly known as "Palace of the People"
People's Palace (Algiers), a public building in Algiers
Palais du Peuple (Guinea), a parliament building in Guinea
Palais du Peuple (Kinshasa), a parliament building in the Democratic Republic of Congo
Sultan's Palace, Zanzibar, formerly "The People's Palace"

See also
People's Palace of Culture, a palace and theater in Pyongyang, North Korea
Maison du Peuple (Brussels), a demolished building in Brussels